The 2013 Marion Blue Racers season is the third season for the Continental Indoor Football League (CIFL) franchise.

The Blue Racers announced they would be leaving the UIFL following the conclusion of the 2012 season. A few days later, the franchise returned to the CIFL. On September 18, 2012, the Blue Racers named CEO and General Manager LaMonte Coleman as the team's fifth head coach in franchise history. Three weeks prior to the season's start, offensive coordinator Martino Theus was promoted to head coach.

Every home game of the 2013 season will be shown on WMNO Marion TV 22, available via broadcast on UHF channel 22 and on Time Warner Cable channel 3 (Marion only).

Roster

Schedule

Regular season

Standings

Coaching staff

References

(http://www.marionstar.com/article/20130321/SPORTS/303210004/Blue-Racers-new-coach)

2013 Continental Indoor Football League season
Marion Blue Racers
Marion Blue Racers